Xenopseustis is a monotypic moth genus of the family Noctuidae. Its only species, Xenopseustis poecilastis, is found in the Australian state of Queensland. Both the genus and species were first described by Edward Meyrick in 1897.

References

Acontiinae
Monotypic moth genera